Quadrini is an Italian surname. Notable people with the surname include:

Daniele Quadrini (born 1980), Italian footballer
Marco Quadrini (born 1979), Italian footballer

See also
 Quadrina

Italian-language surnames